In abstract algebra, an algebra extension is the ring-theoretic equivalent of a group extension.

Precisely, a ring extension of a ring R by an abelian group I is a pair (E) consisting of a ring E and a ring homomorphism  that fits into the short exact sequence of abelian groups:

Note I is then isomorphic to a two-sided ideal of E. Given a commutative ring A, an A-extension or an extension of an A-algebra is defined in the same way by replacing "ring" with "algebra over A" and "abelian groups" with "A-modules".

An extension is said to be trivial or to split if  splits; i.e.,  admits a section that is a ring homomorphism. (see ).

A morphism between extensions of R by I, over say A, is an algebra homomorphism E → E that induces the identities on I and R. By the five lemma, such a morphism is necessarily an isomorphism, and so two extensions are equivalent if there is a morphism between them.

Example: trivial extension 

Let R be a commutative ring and M an R-module. Let E = R ⊕ M be the direct sum of abelian groups. Define the multiplication on E by

Note that identifying (a, x) with a + εx where ε squares to zero and expanding out (a + εx)(b + εy) yields the above formula; in particular we see that E is a ring. It is sometimes called the algebra of dual numbers. Alternatively, E can be defined as  where  is the symmetric algebra of M. We then have the short exact sequence

where p is the projection. Hence, E is an extension of R by M. It is trivial since  is a section (note this section is a ring homomorphism since  is the multiplicative identity of E). Conversely, every trivial extension E of R by I is isomorphic to  if . Indeed, identifying  as a subring of E using a section, we have  via .

One interesting feature of this construction is that the module M becomes an ideal of some new ring. In his book Local Rings, Nagata calls this process the principle of idealization.

Square-zero extension 

Especially in deformation theory, it is common to consider an extension R of a ring (commutative or not) by an ideal whose square is zero. Such an extension is called a square-zero extension, a square extension or just an extension. For a square-zero ideal I, since I is contained in the left and right annihilators of itself, I is a -bimodule.

More generally, an extension by a nilpotent ideal is called a nilpotent extension. For example, the quotient  of a Noetherian commutative ring by the nilradical is a nilpotent extension.

In general,

is a square-zero extension. Thus, a nilpotent extension breaks up into successive square-zero extensions. Because of this, it is usually enough to study square-zero extensions in order to understand nilpotent extensions.

See also 
Formally smooth map
The Wedderburn principal theorem, a statement about an extension by the Jacobson radical.

References

Further reading 
algebra extension at nLab
infinitesimal extension at nLab
Extension of an associative algebra at Encyclopedia of Mathematics

Ring theory